Egypt's Damietta Port is located 10 km west of the Nile river of Damietta branch westward Ras El-Bar, 70 km to the west of Port Said and 200 km from Alexandria Port. The port installations extend on an area of 11.8 km2. The port is bordered by an imaginary line connecting the eastern and western external breakwaters.

Geography

Entrance Channel
The Entrance Channel is 11.4 km long, 15m deep, and 300m wide decreasingly reaching 250m at the breakwater fringe, the approach channel is bordered by 18 nightly-lit buoys.

Breakwaters
The western breakwater is 1640m long with 140m land-based and 1500m sea-based area. 
The eastern breakwater is 738m long with 200m land-based and 538m sea-based area. 
Both breakwaters are made of stacked artificial acrobod piles topped with a concrete head.

Barge Channel
The barge channel consists of two sections; one is 1350m long connecting the barge dock to the sea and the other is 3750m connecting the dock to the Nile estuary. 
Turning Dock The turning dock diameter is 500m with 14.5m depth at the container berth, and 12m depth at the general cargo berth.

See also 
Damietta
Transportation in Egypt

External links 
Damietta Port

Damietta
Damietta Governorate
Ports and harbours of the Arab League
Transport in the Arab League
Mediterranean ports and harbors of Egypt